Kramarzówka  (Kramarivka) is a village in the administrative district of Gmina Pruchnik, within Jarosław County, Subcarpathian Voivodeship, in south-eastern Poland.

The village has a population of 1,500.

References

Villages in Jarosław County